Jaylen Bland (born March 29, 1993) is an American professional basketball player who last played for the Wisconsin Herd of the NBA G League. He played college basketball for Murray State, College of the Canyons, and UC Riverside. In 2019, he was named NBL Canada Newcomer of the Year.

College career
Bland signed with Murray State out of high school but decided to transfer after averaging 1.7 points per game as a freshman. Bland played one season at College of the Canyons before joining UC Riverside. Bland holds the UCR program record with 118 3-pointers in a season. As a senior, Bland was fourth in Division I in made 3-pointers. He was named second-team all-Big West after averaging 16.1 points per game, shooting .404 percent from behind the arc.

Professional career
Bland played for the Salt Lake City Stars of the NBA G League after being drafted 15th overall in the D League draft. He averaged  5.7 points and 2.1 rebounds per game in 39 games. In August 2017, he signed with AB Contern in Luxembourg. In May 2018, Bland signed with Caballeros de Culiacán in Mexico.

Bland signed with the Sudbury Five in November 2018. In the 2018–19 season, Bland finished ninth in NBL Canada in scoring with 18.8 points per game in addition to 5.9 rebounds and 2.3 assists per game. He earned player of the week honors on November 18, 2018. He was named league newcomer of the year. Bland joined the Fraser Valley Bandits of the Canadian Elite Basketball League after the season. He was released by the Bandits on May 23. On November 4, he re-signed with the Five. Bland averaged 24.2 points, 6.0 rebounds, and 4.0 assists per game. He was named to the Second Team All-NBL Canada.

Wisconsin Herd (2021–2022)
Bland was selected with the ninth pick of the third round of the 2021 NBA G League draft by the Wisconsin Herd. On February 12, 2022, Bland was waived by the Wisconsin Herd.

References

External links
UC Riverside Highlanders bio

1993 births
Living people
American expatriate basketball people in Canada
American expatriate basketball people in Luxembourg
American expatriate basketball people in Mexico
American men's basketball players
Basketball players from Michigan
Caballeros de Culiacán players
College of the Canyons alumni
Junior college men's basketball players in the United States
Murray State Racers men's basketball players
Point guards
Salt Lake City Stars players
Sportspeople from Saginaw, Michigan
Sudbury Five players
UC Riverside Highlanders men's basketball players
Wisconsin Herd players